Killen is a town in Lauderdale County, Alabama, United States. It's part of the Florence - Muscle Shoals Metropolitan Statistical Area known as "The Shoals". It was incorporated in 1957. As of the 2020 census, the population of the town is 1,034, down from its record high of 1,119 in 2000.

History
Killen was founded on the Muscle Shoals Canal.

Geography
Killen is located at  (34.861586, -87.529374).

Demographics

2000 census

At the 2000 census there were 1,119 people, 435 households, and 338 families in the town. The racial makeup of the town was 95.26% White, 2.23% Black or African American, 0.45% Asian, 1.61% from other races, and 0.45% from two or more races. 2.59%. were Hispanic or Latino of any race.

Of the 435 households, 35.6% had children under the age of 18 living with them, 66.9% were married couples living together, 7.8% had a female householder with no husband present, and 22.1% were non-families. 18.2% of households were made up of individuals, and 9.0% were one person aged 65 or older. The average household size was 2.57, and the average family size was 2.94.

The age distribution was 24.8% under the age of 18, 7.1% from 18 to 24, 32.2% from 25 to 44, 23.2% from 45 to 64, and 12.6% 65 or older. The median age was 36 years. For every 100 females, there were 91.9 males. For every 100 females age 18 and over, there were 86.9 males.

The median household income was $43,203, and the median family income was $47,596. Males had a median income of $36,957 versus $22,102 for females. The per capita income for the town was $17,872. About 2.4% of families and 5.4% of the population were below the poverty line, including 2.8% of those under age 18 and 8.4% of those age 65 or over.

2010 census
At the 2010 census there were 1,108 people, 457 households, and 323 families in the town. The racial makeup of the town was 94.0% White, 3.2% Black or African American, 0.5% Asian, 1.2% from other races, and 1.0% from two or more races. 2.4%. were Hispanic or Latino of any race.

Of the 457 households, 28.7% had children under the age of 18 living with them, 56.5% were married couples living together, 10.9% had a female householder with no husband present, and 29.3% were non-families. 26.9% of households were made up of individuals, and 10.7% were one person aged 65 or older. The average household size was 2.42, and the average family size was 2.92.

The age distribution was 23.7% under the age of 18, 4.8% from 18 to 24, 26.4% from 25 to 44, 28.5% from 45 to 64, and 16.5% 65 or older. The median age was 40.7 years. For every 100 females, there were 93.7 males. For every 100 females age 18 and over, there were 95.3 males.

The median household income was $48,309, and the median family income was $63,182. Males had a median income of $46,563 versus $34,038 for females. The per capita income for the town was $24,209. About 6.3% of families and 10.2% of the population were below the poverty line, including 12.5% of those under age 18 and 11.9% of those age 65 or over.

2020 census

As of the 2020 United States census, there were 1,034 people, 484 households, and 357 families residing in the town.

Arts and culture
Killen Founder's Day is an annual event celebrated during the second weekend in August.

Notable people
David Briggs, keyboardist, record producer, and recording studio owner
Donna Jean Godchaux, session vocalist and former member of the Grateful Dead
Patrick Hape, former NFL player
Iron Horse, bluegrass band known for their covers of rock songs
Willie Ruff, jazz musician and Yale professor
Marsha Thornton, country music singer
Shonna Tucker, bassist and former member of the Drive-By Truckers

References

External links
Southern Fishing News - Killen Alabama

Towns in Lauderdale County, Alabama
Florence–Muscle Shoals metropolitan area
Towns in Alabama
Alabama populated places on the Tennessee River